Emil Karewicz (13 March 1923 – 18 March 2020) was a Polish actor.

Early life
His acting career began in Wilno, at the local theatre, where he played the role of a monkey in the "Quartet" by Ivan Krylov. During World War II he served in the Polish Army. He fought in the Battle of Berlin in 1945.

Career
After the war, he graduated from Iwo Gall Theatrical Studio (along with Ryszard Barycz, Bronisław Pawlik and Barbara Krafftówna). He played on stages in Łódź, mostly in the Jaracz Theatre and the New Theatre. Since 1962 he performed in Warsaw, in the Ateneum Theatre (Teatr Ateneum im. Stefana Jaracza w Warszawie), the Dramatic Theatre  (Teatr Dramatyczny w Warszawie), and the New Theatre (Teatr Nowy w Warszawie 1947-2005). He retired in 1983. He died on 18 March 2020, five days after turning 97.

Fame
He earned popularity while performing roles of SS-Sturmbannführer Hermann Brunner in TV Series Stawka większa niż życie and SS-Obersturmführer in the film  Jak rozpętałem drugą wojnę światową and King  Władysław II Jagiełło in Krzyżacy.

Selected filmography
 Warsaw Premiere (Warszawska premiera) (1951)
 Youth of Chopin (Młodość Chopina) (1952)
 Kanał (1957)
 Pętla  aka The Noose (1958)
 The Eighth Day of the Week (1958)
 Krzyżacy (1960)
 Tonight a City Will Die (W nocy umrze miasto) (1961)
 Na białym szlaku (1962)
 How I Unleashed World War II (Jak rozpętałem drugą wojnę światową) (1969)
 Hubal (1973)
 Wszyscy i nikt (1977)
 Sekret Enigmy (Enigma Secret) (1979)
 Polonia Restituta (1981)
 Hans Kloss. Stawka większa niż śmierć (2012)

TV series
 Stawka większa niż życie (1967–1968)
 Lalka (1978)<ref>[https://www.imdb.com/title/tt0127384  Lalka (Mini-Series 1978)] at the IMDb.  Retrieved December 6, 2014.</ref>
 Alternatywy 4 (1983)
 Barwy szczęścia (2007–2013)

References

External links
 
Emil Karewicz at the Akademia Polskiego Filmu'' 

1923 births
2020 deaths
Officers of the Order of Polonia Restituta
Recipients of the Order of the Cross of Grunwald, 3rd class
Polish male film actors
Polish male stage actors
Polish male television actors
20th-century Polish male actors
Knights of the Order of Polonia Restituta
Recipients of the Gold Cross of Merit (Poland)